Forrester Island may refer to:
Forrester Island (Alaska)
Forrester Island Wilderness
Forrester Island (Antarctica)